Canto is an album by the jazz saxophonist Charles Lloyd, recorded in December 1996 with Bobo Stenson, Anders Jormin and Billy Hart.

Reception
The AllMusic review by Thom Jurek stated that "Canto is the song of a master who employs all of his tools in the creation of a work of art". The All About Jazz review by Alex Henderson stated: "Lloyd, like Trane, has always been very spiritual, and there's no way getting around the fact that spirituality is a crucial part of Canto. The rewarding post-bop session has a meditative quality, and Lloyd's modal improvisations draw heavily on Middle Eastern and Asian spiritual music... [a] strong addition to Lloyd's catalogue".

Track listing
All compositions by Charles Lloyd
 "Tales of Rumi" - 16:41  
 "How Can I Tell You" - 6:18  
 "Desolation Sound" - 6:05  
 "Canto" - 13:20  
 "Nachiketa's Lament" - 6:18  
 "M" - 13:13  
 "Durga Durga" - 3:20

Personnel
Charles Lloyd - tenor saxophone, Tibetan oboe
Bobo Stenson - piano
Anders Jormin - double bass
Billy Hart - drums

References

1997 albums
ECM Records albums
Albums produced by Manfred Eicher
Charles Lloyd (jazz musician) albums